Slavkovský štít is the fourth highest mountain peak that can be reached on a marked trail in the High Tatra mountains in Slovakia. Its summit is 2452 metres above sea level. It can be reached by foot on a walking trail in about four and a half hours from Starý Smokovec. The first recorded ascent was by Juraj Buchholtz in 1664 and it took the group of 12 members 2 days, while only 4 of them reached the summit.

In 19th century it was considered to build Observatory and Meteorological Station on the summit together with a lift going up from Starý Smokovec. The project turned out to be technically unrealistic.

References

Mountains of Slovakia
Mountains of the Western Carpathians
High Tatras